Oak Soe Khant is a Burmese singer and musician. 

He debuted in December 2018 with the pop album The Number One, which became the country's best-selling solo album in 2019. In 2019, he featured in song "Ma Pyaw Pay Mae" alongside Kay Kay Moe in the film The Greatest Love. He also participated as a contestant in the reality singing competition The Mask Singer Myanmar. In 2020, he made his acting debut in the TV drama,  Eikmet Dwe Moe Hta De Ein. 

In May 2020, he released a single "Possessor", a remake of Zaw Win Shein's classic 1980s song. In June 2020, he was featured in May La Than Zin's album Renewing the Vintage Era, in a duet called "Yone Daw Hlut Daw". In 2021, he released the single "This Christmas" with Thai singer Knomjean Kulamas Sarasas. In 2022, he dabbled with classical Burmese songs (Mahagita), releasing the singles "Aura of Acclaim" and "Stage of Vows, New Road to Nibbana", the latter of which was a duet with Aye Mya Phyu.

Discography

Albums 
 The Number One (2018)

Singles
 "Possessor" (2020)
 "Only You" (2020)
 "Anticipating You" (2020)
 "Instagram" (2020)
 "Mama" (2020)
 "Let's Love Rebelliously" (2020)
 "New Century Lover" (2021)
 "Mandalay in Love" (2022)

Filmography
  Eikmet Dwe Moe Hta De Ein (2020)

References

External links

21st-century Burmese male singers
Burmese singer-songwriters
2002 births
Living people
People from Pyay Region
Burmese pop singers